Anni-Kristiina Juuso (born 4 May 1979, in Ivalo, Finland) is a Sámi actress, who played the leading female role in the movies The Cuckoo and The Kautokeino Rebellion. She was awarded Russia's Best Actress award by both the movie academy and the press. Juuso has also received a State Movie Award, which was handed to her by Vladimir Putin. In addition to her acting career, Juuso works as a radio journalist for YLE Sámi Radio.

Biography 

Anni-Kristiina Juuso studied at the Kallio Upper Secondary School of Performing Arts in Kallio, Helsinki. From 1998 to 1999, she studied theater at Lahti Folk High School in Lahti, Finland under the tutelage of Marietta Tevajärvi.

Awards

The Kautokeino Rebellion
Best Actress (2008) Amanda Award

The Cuckoo
Silver Dolphin Best Actress (2003) at Festróia - Tróia International Film Festival
Nika Best Actress (2003) at the Nika Awards
Golden Aries Best Actress (2002) from the Russian Guild of Film Critics
State Prize of the Russian Federation (2004)

External links
 

1979 births
Living people
People from Inari, Finland
Finnish Sámi people
Finnish film actresses
Finnish television actresses
Sámi actors